Roesler's bent-toed gecko (Cyrtodactylus roesleri) is a species of lizard in the family Gekkonidae. The species is endemic to Southeast Asia.

Etymology
The specific name, roesleri, is in honor of German herpetologist Herbert Rösler (born 1952).

Geographic range
C. roesleri is found in Laos and Vietnam (Quang Binh Province).

Habitat
The preferred habitats of C. roesleri are forest and rocky areas.

Description

Reproduction
The mode of reproduction of C. roesleri is unknown.

References

Further reading
Loos J, Von Wehrden H, Dang KN, Ziegler T (2012). "Niche Segregation in Microhabitat use of Three Sympatric Cyrtodactylus in the Phong Nha-Ke Bang National Park, Central Vietnam". Herpetological Conservation and Biology 7 (1): 101–108.
Ziegler T, Nazarov R, Orlov N, Nguyen TQ, Vu TN, Dang KN, Dinh TH, Schmitz A (2010). "A third new Cyrtodactylus (Squamata: Gekkonidae) from Phong Nha-ke Bang National Park, Truong Son Range, Vietnam". Zootaxa 2413: 20–36. (Cyrtodactylus roesleri, new species).

Cyrtodactylus
Reptiles described in 2010